Ganesh is an Indian actor and television presenter who primarily works in the Kannada film industry.

Films

As actor

Television

References

External links
 

Indian filmographies
Male actor filmographies